Michał Podlaski (born 3 May 1988) is a Polish racing cyclist, who most recently rode for Polish amateur team KS Pogoń Mostostal Puławy. He rode at the 2014 UCI Road World Championships.

Major results

2011
 7th Puchar Ministra Obrony Narodowej
2012
 10th Tour Bohemia
2013
 7th Overall Okolo Jižních Čech
2014
 3rd Road race, National Road Championships
2015
 6th Coupe des Carpathes
 7th Visegrad 4 Bicycle Race – GP Polski
 10th Visegrad 4 Bicycle Race – GP Czech Republic
2016
 3rd Coupe des Carpathes
2017
 4th Overall Course de Solidarność et des Champions Olympiques
 6th Overall East Bohemia Tour
 9th Puchar Uzdrowisk Karpackich
2018
 1st  Mountains classification Course de Solidarność et des Champions Olympiques
 1st  Mountains classification Szlakiem Walk Majora Hubala
 2nd Puchar Uzdrowisk Karpackich
 5th GP Czech Republic, Visegrad 4 Bicycle Race
2019
 3rd Korona Kocich Gór
 7th Memoriał Andrzeja Trochanowskiego
 9th Puchar Uzdrowisk Karpackich
 10th Puchar Ministra Obrony Narodowej
2020
 9th Overall Tour de Serbie

References

External links

1988 births
Living people
Polish male cyclists
People from Wołomin
Sportspeople from Masovian Voivodeship
European Games competitors for Poland
Cyclists at the 2015 European Games